SuperStar Search Slovakia (Slovensko hľadá SuperStar) was a casting television show based on the popular British show Pop Idol. The show was a contest to determine the best young singer in Slovakia and was shown by the national TV network STV from season 1 & 2. Season 3 was broadcast by private TV-channel Markíza.

All seasons of SuperStar Search Slovakia had 4 audition cities to find the best new talent all over Slovakia, including: Košice, Banská Bystrica, Žilina and finally finishing in Bratislava.

Czech and Slovak SuperStar

International SuperStar 

Czech broadcaster TV Nova and broadcaster of Slovak version of Idol TV Markíza confirmed that both versions will be joined into one federal show Czech-Slovak SuperStar, see Česko Slovenská Superstar. Upcoming federal version started on 6 September 2009.
The promo started on 15 May 2009 and the main slogan of these season is “Two languages, one voice/vote.”
The web page of the first Czech and Slovak Idol: SuperStar.TV

Cast

Hosts 

Key
 Host of SuperStar

Judges 

Key
 Judges of SuperStar

Series overview
Color key

Season 1 

In season 1, eleven contestants made it to the finals. The first single recorded by TOP 11 is called "Kým vieš snívať" (As long as you can dream) and it was composed by judge Pavol Habera (music) and slovak poem writer Daniel Hevier. Every final night has its theme. Audience can vote for contestants from the very beginning of the show, voting ends during result show on the same day.

Season 2 

In season 2 eleven contestants made it to the finals. The first single recorded by TOP 11 is called "So mnou môžeš rátať" (You can count on with me) and it was composed by judge Pavol Habera (music) and slovak poem writer Daniel Hevier. Every final night has its theme. Audience can vote for contestants from the very beginning of the show, voting ends during result show on the same day.

Season 3 

Season 3 launched on September 2, 2007 and was broadcast by private TV Markíza, which came with many changes, like new graphic ident, or things that were missing in seasons 1 & 2, such as Green Mile or gradual eliminating also in semifinals. Ten contestants made it to the finals. The first single recorded by TOP 10 is called "Dotkni sa hviezd" (Touch the Stars) and it was composed by judge Pavol Habera (music) and slovak poem writer Daniel Hevier. Every final night has its theme. Audience can vote for contestants from the very beginning of the show, voting ends during result show on the next day.

External links 
 Official Season 3 Site
 Official Season 2 Site
 Official Season 1 Site
 Unofficial site
 Slovensko hľadá SuperStar releases

 
Slovak music television series
Slovak reality television series
Television series by Fremantle (company)
2004 Slovak television series debuts
2007 Slovak television series endings
2000s Slovak television series
Slovak television series based on British television series